Matt Hammitt (born October 19, 1979) is an American singer, songwriter, speaker and author. He was the lead singer for Sanctus Real, which has released seven studio albums with Sparrow Records, toured internationally and released 14 top five and number one singles to Christian radio. Hammitt left Sanctus Real effective December 2015 to spend more time with his family. He also pursued a solo career.  He has since released one solo album, Every Falling Tear.

Career 
Hammitt has been the recipient of three Dove Awards, has been nominated for two Grammys for his work with Sanctus Real, and has received multiple awards from SESAC and ASCAP for radio chart performance. He has also co-written songs for other artists, including for King & Country, Francesca Battistelli, Jamie Grace, Newsong, Hawk Nelson, Moriah Peters, Jason Gray, Citizen Way and Love and the Outcome.

Hammitt is also currently a partner with FamilyLife Ministries out of Little Rock, Arkansas, as a speaker for their "Weekend to Remember" marriage retreats.

In July 2016, Hammitt partnered with  Seth Mosley's Full Circle Music Company (FCM Records). Hammitt was first signed as a writer for FCM songs, followed by an album deal with FCM Records. His second solo album will be his debut for FCM and was to be released in early 2017.

Solo album: Every Falling Tear
In September 2010, Hammitt's wife gave birth to their third child, Bowen, who had a life-threatening heart defect. Leading up to Bowen's birth, Hammitt wrote his first solo album, Every Falling Tear (Sparrow Records). The album was released in September 2011, carrying the theme of trusting God in the darkest seasons of life.

Compilations 
 In Christ Alone: Modern Hymns of Worship with Bethany Dillon (2008) Sparrow
 Empty (Disciples) - Dan Haseltine/ Matt Hammitt

Children's book 
In March 2012, Tyndale House Publishers released a hardcover children's book, I Couldn't Love You More, which is based on a song from Hammitt's album Every Falling Tear and co-written by Jason Ingram.

Podcast 
After leaving Sanctus Real, he and his wife launched a podcast called The Lead Me Lifecast, along with "LEAD ME LIVE" conferences and concert events. The events focused on building men, marriages and family. The Lead Me Lifecast is a podcast produced and hosted by Hammitt.

Personal life 
Hammitt married Sarah Schooler in mid-2001. They have four children: Emerson Mae Hammitt, Claire Hammitt, Bowen Hammitt, and Luis Hammitt.

Discography

Albums 
{| class="wikitable" style="text-align:center;"
! rowspan="2"| Year
! rowspan="2"| Album details
! colspan="4"| Peak chart positions   
|- style="font-size:smaller;"   
! width="40"| USChrist.   
! width="40"| USHeat   
|-   
| 2011
| align="left"| Every Falling Tear
 Release date: September 13, 2011
 Label: Sparrow
 Format: CD, digital download
| 26
| 29
|-
| 2017
| align="left"| Matt Hammitt<ref>{{cite web|url=http://www.jesusfreakhideout.com/cdreviews/MattHammitt.asp|title='Matt Hammitt|date=November 16, 2017|first=Chase | last=Tremaine|publisher=Jesus Freak Hideout|accessdate=May 28, 2019}}</ref>
 Release date: November 17, 2017
 Label: Full Circle Music
 Format: CD, digital download
| —
| —
|-
| 2020
| align="left"| Treetop Release date: September 25, 2020
| —
| —
|}

 EPs Living Room Sessions (Acoustic) - EP'' (January 25, 2019, Full Circle Music)

Singles

References

External links 
 

1979 births
American performers of Christian music
Living people
Singers from Ohio
Musicians from Toledo, Ohio
Songwriters from Ohio
Sparrow Records artists
21st-century American singers
21st-century American male singers
American male songwriters